Monetaria caputdraconis, common name the "dragon's-head cowry", is a species of sea snail, a cowry, a marine gastropod mollusk in the family Cypraeidae, the cowries.

 The common name of this species comes from its Latin name caputdraconis, meaning "the head of the dragon".

Description
It is pyriform with rather long teeth. The basic color of the shell is uniformly brown on its edge, with many yellowish small spots on the top of the dorsum.

Distribution
This endemic species is found in the sea along Easter Island and Sala y Gomez Island, where it replaces the similar Monetaria caputserpentis. It is mainly encountered under coral rocks in the intertidal reef.

References
 Lorenz F. & Hubert A. (2000) A guide to worldwide cowries. Edition 2. Hackenheim: Conchbooks. 584 pp

External links
 Biolib
 
 WoRMS

Cypraeidae
Molluscs of Chile
Fauna of Easter Island
Endemic fauna of Chile
Gastropods described in 1888
Oceanian realm fauna